Ballintoy Parish Church is the main Church of Ireland church of Ballintoy, County Antrim, Northern Ireland. The church, located a short distance from the town, is one of the most northerly churches in the Diocese of Connor. It is a Grade-B+ listed building.

History
The church as it now stands was completed in 1813 as a replacement for an older structure. It was built under the auspices of Revd Robert Trail to a plan drawn by Henry Wynne. In June 1857, a new organ was installed by Dublin-based firm Telford & Telford, at a cost of £37. A renovation was undertaken in 1883 and involved adding a new pulpit, pews, flooring and heating. Repairs were also made to the roof and spire. Further roof repairs were undertaken following damage caused by a hurricane in December 1894.

Architecture
The church is two bays in length, with a single north transept, the tower being retained from an earlier building. Between the nave and the transept is a small chapel or baptistry.

Features
On an exterior wall of the church is a sun dial and tide clock which are dated by an inscription to 1817.

Though no longer rung, the old church bell bears the following inscription:
"Archibald Stewart gave me: Charles, his son, re-cast me, anno 1686 and Archibald the son of Charles re-cast and augmented me anno 1718"

The communion plate or chalice is reputed to have been manufactured before 1638 by Dublin silversmith James Vanderbeg or Vanderbeck.

References

Church of Ireland church buildings in Northern Ireland
Buildings and structures completed in 1813
Churches in County Antrim
19th-century churches in Northern Ireland